Pokémon the Movie: Secrets of the Jungle is a 2020 Japanese anime film based on Satoshi Tajiri's Pokémon media franchise and produced by OLM. It is the twenty-third and most recent film in the Pokémon universe with Ash, the third and final film in the Alternate Timeline series covering Generation VIII. The film returns to the series’ traditional 2D art style rather than using the CGI animation used in Mewtwo Strikes Back: Evolution. It features the new Generation VIII Mythical Pokémon Zarude and a shiny Celebi.

In Japan, the film was released on December 25, 2020, by Toho. The original release date of July 10, 2020, was delayed due to the COVID-19 pandemic in Japan. The film released worldwide (excluding Japan, Korea, and China) on Netflix on October 8, 2021.

For a limited time, if players of Pokémon Sword and Shield preordered tickets for this film's premiere, they would get the Mythical Pokémon Zarude in its "Dada" form and a Shiny Celebi. This is the last Pokémon film to date.

Plot 

In the Forest of Okoya, the Mythical Pokémon Zarude finds an infant boy in a cradle washed up on a riverbank. Unable to leave the child on his own, Zarude adopts him as a son, giving him the name "Koko". Zarude leaves his tribe, which inhabits a Great Tree deep in the jungle where humans are forbidden to venture, to raise Koko who grows up as a feral child.

Ten years later, Ash Ketchum and Pikachu visit the Forest of Okoya from nearby Milyfa Town. While attempting to capture a wild Cramorant, Ash and Pikachu encounter a research team from the Biotope Company, a scientific organization studying the jungle. Team Rocket, covertly following them, look up information on the Biotope Company and its leader Dr. Zed, and decide to infiltrate the group.

Later, Ash sees Koko go over a waterfall, after he got knocked out from a pipe while swinging on a vine with a wild Skwovet, and retrieves him from the water, bringing him to Milyfa Town's Pokémon Center for treatment. When Koko awakens, he becomes alarmed and escapes the building, having never seen other humans before. Discovering that Koko believes himself to be a Pokémon, Ash and Pikachu spend time with him in the town, helping him to learn about humans for the first time.

Ash, Pikachu and Koko later encounter Zarude, who is forced to admit the truth about Koko's heritage. Zarude brings them to an abandoned laboratory he found shortly after adopting Koko, where he shows them a photograph he found of an infant Koko with his human parents. Zarude then leaves, returning to the Great Tree alone.

Discovering a wallet from Biotope Company, Ash brings Koko to their headquarters, where they meet with Dr. Zed. He reveals that Koko's parents are Chrom and Phossa Molybdenum, a pair of scientists who led the organization in researching the healing springs, and that Koko's real name is Al Molybdenum. However, Chrom and Phossa were killed in a car accident ten years ago, which was presumed to have killed Al as well. Dr. Zed scans Koko's pendant and discovers partially corrupted data on it that reveals an image of the Great Tree. Distraught over the news of his parents' fate, Koko flees to the Great Tree as well.

As soon as he reaches the Great Tree, Koko discovers a tracking chip planted on him by Dr. Zed. Zed arrives with his research team, which Team Rocket have infiltrated, along with a giant, spider-like tank. Koko and Ash try to stop Zed's actions, but he restrains them using his Ariados and throws them into the back of one of his trucks. He then fires missiles at the Great Tree, blasting open holes from which the spring water gushes forth. Ash, Pikachu and Koko escape with unwitting help from Team Rocket as they wrestle with the Cramorant from earlier and confront Dr. Zed, who suffers a psychotic breakdown and admits that, when Chrom and Phossa Molybden discovered the Great Tree's location but refused to continue researching it out of respect for the Zarude tribe, he killed the couple by running them off a road and stealing their supply of the spring water before leaving them to die in the explosion of their wrecked car. Before they perished, Chrom and Phossa sent the infant Al down the river with a drive containing the rest of their research, leading to Zarude finding him.

Dr. Zed seizes control of the tank from his henchmen, and Ash, Pikachu and Koko try to fight him to no avail. Zarude's tribe arrives, having been convinced to help save the jungle by Zarude who raised Koko. Koko's father figure also brings a group of wild Pokémon, who previously disliked his tribe due to their selfish behavior, to assist. Zarude is injured in the battle and nearly succumbs, but Koko manages to harness the power of the jungle as if he were indeed a Pokémon, healing him. With all their combined forces, they manage to break the tank's power source, disabling it. Zed attempts to escape, but is captured by Koko.

In the aftermath, the humans and Pokémon work together to restore the damage done to the jungle. Dr. Zed is arrested for his crimes and is loaded into a police van by Officer Jenny, based on evidence leaked by Team Rocket. Koko decides to leave to explore the human world and become the bridge between humans and Pokémon, taking the photograph of his parents along with him. As he and Ash leave the Forest of Okoya, they see Zarude turn the healing springs into a geyser to send Koko off. Cheered up by this, Koko goes forth into his future, embracing his dual identity as a Zarude and a human. At the Great Tree, Zarude who raised Koko sees a Shiny Celebi, which observes Zarude now living in harmony with the other Pokémon.

Voice cast

Music 
Pokémon the Movie: Koko Music Collection (Japanese: 「劇場版ポケットモンスター ココ」ミュージックコレクション) is the official soundtrack of the movie that was released in Japan on December 23, 2020. Koko by Beverly is the Japanese opening theme for the movie. Pokémon the Movie: Koko Theme Song Collection (Japanese: 「劇場版ポケットモンスター ココ」テーマソング集), the album for the opening theme was also released on December 23, 2020.

The movie has 6 theme songs, all written by Taiiku Okazaki; this is the first time that a Pokémon movie had multiple theme songs all written by the same artist:

 The Rule Song (Insert Song)
 Koko (Opening Theme Song)
 Show Window (Insert Song)
 The Hum of the Forest (Insert Song)
 Strange and Wonderful Creatures (Main Theme Song)
 I'm Home and Welcome Back (Ending Theme Song)

Release

Theatrical run 
The film was released on December 25, 2020, in Japan. The original release date of July 10, 2020, was delayed due to the COVID-19 pandemic.

Home media 
The film was released on DVD and Blu-ray in Japan on July 14, 2021, and in North America on October 18, 2022.

Streaming 
The film was released worldwide on Netflix on October 8, 2021.

Box office 
In Japan, Pokémon the Movie: Secrets of the Jungle grossed  .

See also 
 List of films based on video games

Notes

References

External links 

 Official Japanese site (in Japanese)
  at Netflix
 
 

2020 anime films
2020 films
2020s Japanese-language films
Animated films about monkeys
Anime postponed due to the COVID-19 pandemic
Films postponed due to the COVID-19 pandemic
Films set in jungles
Films scored by Shinji Miyazaki
Japanese animated fantasy films
Japanese sequel films
OLM, Inc. animated films
Coco
Toho animated films